Morrell Potrero is a flat located in the Cleveland National Forest in Riverside County, California. It is drained by Morrell Canyon Creek, a tributary of San Juan Creek.

History
Originally the site of the Morrell Ranch, the Morrell Potrero is now the site of Rancho Capistrano, a private, gated community surrounded by the Cleveland National Forest.

References 

Landforms of Riverside County, California
Santa Ana Mountains
Cleveland National Forest